Celaenorrhinus bettoni, also known as Betton's sprite or Betton's flat, is a species of butterfly in the family Hesperiidae. It is found in Nigeria, Cameroon, the Democratic Republic of the Congo, Uganda, Kenya, Tanzania, Zambia, Mozambique and eastern Zimbabwe. The habitat consists of forests.

Adult males mud-puddle.

References

Butterflies described in 1902
bettoni